Lenalidomide, sold under the trade name Revlimid among others, is a medication used to treat multiple myeloma, smoldering myeloma, and myelodysplastic syndromes (MDS). For multiple myeloma, it is used after at least one other treatment and generally with dexamethasone. It is taken by mouth.

Common side effects include diarrhea, itchiness, joint pain, fever, headache, and trouble sleeping. Severe side effects include low blood platelets, low white blood cells, and blood clots. Use during pregnancy may harm the fetus. The dose may need to be adjusted in people with kidney problems. It has a chemical structure similar to thalidomide but has a different mechanism of action. How it works is not entirely clear as of 2019.

Lenalidomide was approved for medical use in the United States in 2005. It is on the World Health Organization's List of Essential Medicines.

Medical uses

Multiple myeloma
Lenalidomide is used to treat multiple myeloma. It is a more potent molecular analog of thalidomide, which inhibits tumor angiogenesis, tumor-secreted cytokines, and tumor proliferation through induction of apoptosis.

Lenalidomide is effective at inducing a complete or "very good partial" response and improves progression-free survival. Adverse events more common in people receiving lenalidomide for myeloma include neutropenia, deep vein thrombosis, infections, and an increased risk of other hematological malignancies. The risk of second primary hematological malignancies does not outweigh the benefit of using lenalidomide in relapsed or refractory multiple myeloma. It may be more difficult to mobilize stem cells for autograft in people who have received lenalidomide.

In 2006, lenalidomide received U.S. Food and Drug Administration (FDA) clearance for use in combination with dexamethasone in people with multiple myeloma who have received at least one prior therapy. In 2017, the FDA approved lenalidomide as standalone maintenance therapy (without dexamethasone) for people with multiple myeloma following autologous stem cell transplant.

In 2009, The National Institute for Health and Clinical Excellence issued a final appraisal determination approving lenalidomide in combination with dexamethasone as an option to treat people with multiple myeloma who have received two or more prior therapies in England and Wales.

The use of lenalidomide combined with other drugs was evaluated. It was seen that the drug combinations of lenalidomide plus dexamethasone and continuous bortezomib plus lenalidomide plus dexamethasone probably result in an increase of the overall survival.

Myelodysplastic syndromes 
Lenalidomide was approved by the FDA on 27 December 2005 for patients with low- or intermediate-1-risk myelodysplastic syndromes who have chromosome 5q deletion syndrome (5q- syndrome) with or without additional cytogenetic abnormalities. It was approved on 17 June 2013 by the European Medicines Agency for use in patients with low- or intermediate-1-risk myelodysplastic syndromes who have 5q- deletion syndrome but no other cytogenetic abnormalities and are dependent on red blood cell transfusions, for whom other treatment options have been found to be insufficient or inadequate.

Mantle cell lymphoma 
Lenalidomide is approved by FDA as a specialty drug requiring a specialty pharmacy distribution for mantle cell lymphoma in patients whose disease has relapsed or progressed after at least two prior therapies, one of which must have included the medicine bortezomib.

AL amyloidosis 
Although not specifically approved by the FDA for use in treating AL amyloidosis, lenalidomide is widely used in the treatment of that condition, often in combination with dexamethasone.

Adverse effects
In addition to embryo-fetal toxicity, lenalidomide carries black box warnings for hematologic toxicity (including neutropenia and thrombocytopenia) and thromboembolism. Serious side effects include thrombosis, pulmonary embolus, hepatotoxicity, and bone marrow toxicity resulting in neutropenia and thrombocytopenia. Myelosuppression is the major dose-limiting toxicity, which is not the case with thalidomide.

Lenalidomide may be associated with adverse effects as second primary malignancy, severe cutaneous reactions, hypersensitivity reactions, tumor lysis syndrome, tumor flare reaction, hypothyroidism, and hyperthyroidism.

Teratogenicity
Lenalidomide is related to thalidomide, which is known to be teratogenic. Tests in monkeys suggest that lenalidomide is likewise teratogenic. It cannot be prescribed for women who are pregnant or who may become pregnant during therapy. For this reason, the drug is only available in the United States through a restricted distribution system in conjunction with a risk evaluation and mitigation strategy. Females who may become pregnant must use at least two forms of reliable contraception during treatment and for at least four weeks after discontinuing treatment with lenalidomide.

Venous thromboembolism
Lenalidomide, like its parent compound thalidomide, may cause venous thromboembolism, a potentially serious complication with their use. High rates of venous thromboembolism have been found in patients with multiple myeloma who received thalidomide or lenalidomide in conjunction with dexamethasone, melphalan, or doxorubicin.

Stevens-Johnson syndrome

In March 2008, the U.S. Food and Drug Administration (FDA) included lenalidomide on a list of twenty prescription drugs under investigation for potential safety problems. The drug was investigated for possibly increasing the risk of developing Stevens–Johnson syndrome, a life-threatening skin condition.

FDA ongoing safety review

In 2011, the FDA initiated an ongoing review of clinical trials that found an increased risk of developing cancers such as acute myelogenous leukemia and B-cell lymphoma, though it did not advise patients to discontinue treatment with lenalidomide.

Mechanism of action
Lenalidomide has been used to successfully treat both inflammatory disorders and cancers in the past ten years. There are multiple mechanisms of action, and they can be simplified by organizing them as mechanisms of action in vitro and in vivo. In vitro, lenalidomide has three main activities: direct anti-tumor effect, inhibition of angiogenesis, and immunomodulation. In vivo, lenalidomide induces tumor cell apoptosis directly and indirectly by inhibition of bone marrow stromal cell support, by anti-angiogenic and anti-osteoclastogenic effects, and by immunomodulatory activity. Lenalidomide has a broad range of activities that can be exploited to treat many hematologic and solid cancers.

On a molecular level, lenalidomide has been shown to interact with the ubiquitin E3 ligase cereblon and target this enzyme to degrade the Ikaros transcription factors IKZF1 and IKZF3. This mechanism was unexpected as it suggests that the major action of lenalidomide is to re-target the activity of an enzyme rather than block the activity of an enzyme or signaling process, and thereby represents a novel mode of drug action. A more specific implication of this mechanism is that the teratogenic and anti-neoplastic properties of lenalidomide, and perhaps other thalidomide derivatives, could be disassociated.

History

Lenalidomide was approved for medical use in the United States in 2005.

Society and culture

Economics
Lenalidomide made almost $9.7bn for Celgene in 2018.

Research
Lenalidomide is undergoing clinical trial as a treatment for Hodgkin's lymphoma, as well as non-Hodgkin's lymphoma, chronic lymphocytic leukemia and solid tumor cancers, such as carcinoma of the pancreas. One Phase III clinical trial being conducted by Celgene in elderly patients with B-cell chronic lymphocytic leukemia was halted in July 2013, when a disproportionate number of cancer deaths were observed during treatment with lenalidomide versus patients treated with chlorambucil.

References

External links 
 

Antineoplastic drugs
Aromatic amines
Bristol Myers Squibb
Drugs with unknown mechanisms of action
Glutarimides
Immunosuppressants
Isoindolines
World Health Organization essential medicines
Wikipedia medicine articles ready to translate